La Grande Mare Hotel Golf & Country Club is a hotel and golf course in Vazon Bay, Castel, Guernsey. The house, set in 120 acres, contains 12 suites, 12 double rooms and 10 self-catering units.

References

External links
Official site

Hotels in Guernsey
Golf clubs and courses in the Channel Islands